Miles William Wood (born September 13, 1995) is an American professional ice hockey forward for the New Jersey Devils of the National Hockey League (NHL). Wood was drafted by the Devils in the fourth round of the 2013 NHL Entry Draft.

Playing career
Miles Wood was born in Buffalo, New York but grew up in Manchester, Massachusetts. As a youth, Wood played in the 2007 Quebec International Pee-Wee Hockey Tournament with the Middlesex Islanders minor ice hockey team, along with teammates Jon Gillies and Matt Grzelcyk.

Following the 2015–16 season, his freshman year with Boston College in the Hockey East, Wood ended his collegiate career in signing a three-year entry-level contract with the New Jersey Devils on April 8, 2016. He made his NHL debut for the Devils the following night on April 9, 2016, against the Toronto Maple Leafs.

On November 29, 2016, Wood scored his first NHL goal in a 3–2 loss to the Winnipeg Jets.

The 2017–18 season was a breakout year for Wood who set career highs in points and played in his first NHL playoff game. On November 12, 2017, Wood scored his first NHL hat trick in a 7–5 win over the Chicago Blackhawks. On February 18, 2018, Wood was suspended without pay for 2 games for boarding Tampa Bay Lightning forward Vladislav Namestnikov. Wood helped the Devils clinch a spot in the 2018 Stanley Cup playoffs by scoring the goal that won the game in a 2–1 win over the Toronto Maple Leafs on April 5, 2018. Wood ended the regular season with a career-best 32 points and signed a four-year contract with the Devils before the 2018–19 season.

Personal life
When Wood was 11 years old he wrote a letter to Washington Capitals star, Alexander Ovechkin, asking him to autograph his hockey card. In the letter, Wood promised that if Ovechkin did not sign and return the card that he would check him the first chance he got to play against him when he made it to the NHL. Although Ovechkin never returned the card, he autographed a photo for Wood before facing him for the first time at the Verizon Center.

Wood's father is former professional hockey player Randy Wood, who played for the New York Islanders, Buffalo Sabres, Toronto Maple Leafs, and Dallas Stars before retiring.  His mother is Cheryl Wood. Wood also has a brother Tyler, born in 1994, who currently plays with ERC Sonthofen in the German league Oberliga.

Career statistics

Regular season and playoffs

International

References

External links
 

1995 births
Living people
Albany Devils players
American men's ice hockey left wingers
Boston College Eagles men's ice hockey players
Ice hockey people from Buffalo, New York
New Jersey Devils draft picks
New Jersey Devils players
Noble and Greenough School alumni